The 2020 United States Senate election in Delaware was held on November 3, 2020, to elect a member of the United States Senate to represent the State of Delaware, concurrently with the 2020 U.S. presidential election, as well as other elections to the United States Senate, elections to the United States House of Representatives and various state and local elections.

Incumbent Democratic Senator Chris Coons ran for reelection to a second full term and won against Republican challenger Lauren Witzke with 59.4% of the vote. He outperformed Democratic presidential nominee and former Delaware Senator Joe Biden (whose seat Coons was elected to in a 2010 special election) by 0.7 percentage points, compared to the concurrent presidential election.

Democratic primary

Candidates

Nominee
 Chris Coons, incumbent U.S. Senator

Eliminated in primary
 Jessica Scarane, technology executive

Withdrawn
Scott Walker, Republican nominee for Delaware's at-large congressional district in 2018 (running for governor as a Republican)

Declined
 Lisa Blunt Rochester, incumbent U.S. Representative for Delaware's at-large congressional district (running for re-election)
 Kerri Evelyn Harris, former candidate for the Democratic nomination for U.S. Senate in 2018

Endorsements

Polling

with Lisa Blunt Rochester and Chris Coons

with Chris Coons and more liberal female Democrat

Results

Republican primary

Candidates

Nominee
 Lauren Witzke, far-right activist and proponent of the QAnon conspiracy theory

Eliminated in primary
 James DeMartino, attorney and nominee for Delaware House of Representatives in 2016 & 2018

Declined
Rob Arlett, former Sussex County councilman and nominee for U.S. Senate in 2018

Endorsements

Results

Other candidates

Libertarian Party

Nominee
Nadine Frost, Libertarian candidate for U.S. Senate in 2018

Independent Party of Delaware

Nominee
Mark Turley, small business owner

General election
Prior to the election, Christopher Coons' re-election was considered to be a near certainty regardless of the Republican challenger. The choice of Lauren Witzke, a controversial extremist and believer of QANON, as the nominee only cemented this prediction. Networks declared Coons the winner as soon as voting ended based on Exit Polling alone. Coons also outperformed Biden (who also once held this Senate seat) in terms of percentage but underperformed in terms of raw vote, likely due to the lack of third-party Senate candidates.

Predictions

Endorsements

Polling

Results 

Counties that flipped from Republican to Democratic
 Kent (largest municipality: Dover)

Notes

References

External links
 
 
  (State affiliate of the U.S. League of Women Voters)
 

Official campaign websites
 Chris Coons (D) for Senate
 Mark Turley (I) for Senate
 Lauren Witzke (R) for Senate

2020
Delaware
United States Senate